Jack Barry Ludwig (August 30, 1922 – February 12, 2018) was a Canadian-born American-resident novelist, short story writer, and sportswriter.

Born and raised in the Jewish Canadian community of Winnipeg, Manitoba, Ludwig was educated at the University of Manitoba, graduating with a Bachelor of Arts in 1944, and the University of California, Los Angeles, earning his Ph.D. in 1953. He remained a resident of the United States for most of his adult life, holding teaching positions at institutions such as the University of Minnesota and the State University of New York at Stony Brook. He was a friend and acolyte of Saul Bellow early in his career, although this relationship was damaged by Ludwig's extramarital affair with Bellow's then-wife Sondra; Ludwig was the basis of the character Valentine Gersbach in Bellow's novel Herzog.

Ludwig's novels include Confusions (1963), Above Ground (1968), and A Woman of Her Age (1973). Above Ground, a thinly veiled response to his portrayal in Herzog, was later reprinted as part of McClelland & Stewart's New Canadian Library series. He also published numerous short stories in literary magazines, although he never published a collection of his short stories in book form.

He was, however, most highly regarded for his journalism, which concentrated almost exclusively on sportswriting following the publication of Hockey Night in Moscow in 1972.

Ludwig was the subject of a chapter in Graeme Gibson's 1973 non-fiction work Eleven Canadian Novelists.

Works
Confusions (1963)
Above Ground (1968)
Hockey Night in Moscow (1972)
A Woman of Her Age (1973)
The Great Hockey Thaw; or, The Russians Are Here! (1974)
Five Ring Circus: The Montreal Olympics (1976)
Games of Fear and Winning: Sports with an Inside View (1976)
The Great American Spectaculars: The Kentucky Derby, Mardi Gras, and Other Days of Celebration (1976)

References

1922 births
2018 deaths
20th-century Canadian novelists
Canadian male novelists
Canadian male short story writers
Canadian sportswriters
Writers from Winnipeg
University of Manitoba alumni
University of California, Los Angeles alumni
20th-century Canadian short story writers
Canadian expatriate journalists in the United States
20th-century Canadian male writers
Canadian male non-fiction writers
Jewish Canadian journalists